Thomas Burke (1833 – 27 October 1883) was a United States Navy sailor and a recipient of the United States military's highest decoration, the Medal of Honor.

A native of County Galway, Ireland, Burke immigrated to the U.S. and joined the Navy from the state of New York on January 21, 1862. For this action, he and his shipmates, Seaman Richard Bates and Captain of the After-guard John Brown, were awarded the Medal of Honor three months later, on August 1.

Burke's official Medal of Honor citation reads:
For heroic conduct, with 2 comrades, in rescuing from drowning James Rose and John Russell, seamen, of the U.S.S. Winooski, off Eastport, Maine, 10 May 1866.

Burke died at age 51. The cause of death is unknown. (Per Pension File) He was later buried at St. Michael's Church in the town of Pensacola, county of Escambia, Florida in 1883, as evidenced in his pension file. St. Elizabeth's in Washington, D.C. and the National Cemeteries Administration have recently acknowledged that he was never buried in Washington, D.C., although the mistake is listed on many websites to this day. There are veterans of the same name at this cemetery in Washington, D.C. but none received the Medal of Honor. The erroneous Medal of Honor grave marker in Washington, D.C. is in the process (as of January 2016) of being replaced by a non Medal of Honor marker. Many officials and others have played a role in solving this riddle over the past few years, including the dedicated staff at St. Elizabeth's, and the Medal of Honor Historical Society of the US, the Congressional Medal of Honor Society, the National Cemeteries Administration and others.

St. Michaels in Pensacola has several burial grounds, and is currently trying to determine which one Burke was buried in.

See also

List of Medal of Honor recipients during peacetime

References

External links

 at Find a Grave

1833 births
1883 deaths
19th-century Irish people
Irish-born Medal of Honor recipients
Irish emigrants to the United States (before 1923)
People from County Galway
United States Navy sailors
United States Navy Medal of Honor recipients
Non-combat recipients of the Medal of Honor
Military personnel from County Galway